GIFC may refer to:

 Geylang International FC, a professional football club based in Bedok, Singapore
 Global Internet Freedom Consortium, a consortium of organizations that develop and deploy anti-censorship technologies for use by Internet users